"You're the One That I Want" is a song performed by American actor and singer John Travolta and Anglo-Australian singer, songwriter and actress Olivia Newton-John for the 1978 film version of the musical Grease. It was written and produced by John Farrar, and released in May 1978 as the second single from Grease: The Original Soundtrack from the Motion Picture. The song is one of the best-selling singles in history to date, having sold over 4 million copies in the United States and the United Kingdom alone, with estimates of more than 15 million copies sold overall.

Background
"You're the One That I Want" was one of the two singles, along with "Hopelessly Devoted to You", that Farrar wrote specifically for Newton-John's appearance in the film that had not been in the original stage musical. Randal Kleiser, the film's director, was not fond of this song  because he felt that it did not mesh well with the rest of the Warren Casey-Jim Jacobs score.

Record World called it "a frantic, up-tempo duet between the two stars that is bound to leave listeners breathless."

Synopsis
Danny Zuko (Travolta), leader of the T-Birds, has recently lettered in cross-country running in an effort to win back his estranged girlfriend Sandy Olsson (Newton-John); unbeknownst to him, Sandy, who has been conflicted about her upright and proper etiquette in a school full of brash greasers, has herself transformed into a greaser queen to win back Danny. In the song, Danny expresses pleasant shock and arousal at Sandy's transformation, with Sandy responding that Danny must "shape up" to prove himself capable of treating her the right way.

The song originally written at this point in the original musical, "All Choked Up" (which had previously replaced a song titled "Kiss It"), was similar in theme, but different in style, written as a pastiche of Elvis Presley's "All Shook Up" and with Sandy being more provocative. "All Choked Up" was one of two songs from the Jacobs/Casey score that was excised completely from both the film and the film's soundtrack. Most 21st-century performances of the musical also include "You're the One That I Want" instead of "All Choked Up".

Chart performance
Upon its release in conjunction with the film (and its status as a potential blockbuster worldwide), the single became a huge international hit, reaching number one in several countries.

In the United States, the single reached number one on the Billboard Hot 100 and on July 18 was certified Platinum for shipments exceeding 2 million copies. (It was already Gold by April 12.)

It also topped the UK Singles Chart for nine weeks in the summer of 1978, some months before the film had even been released in that country. As of 2018, it is still the fifth best-selling single of all time in the United Kingdom, where it has sold two million copies.

In Australia, the single spent nine nonconsecutive weeks at the top and became the best charting single of the year.

1998 re-release
A re-released "Martian remix" of the single by PolyGram Records reached #4 in the United Kingdom and #27 in Australia in 1998, the twentieth anniversary of the film's debut.

Charts

Weekly charts

Year-end charts

Sales and certifications

}

Cover versions

British comedians Arthur Mullard and Hylda Baker also released a version of the song in 1978. Their version reached No. 22 in the United Kingdom.

In 1978, the German comedians Dieter Hallervorden and Helga Feddersen released a parody version under the title Du, die Wanne ist voll. The song reached position number four in the German charts.

Also in 1978, the Swedish crooner Svante Thuresson released a version in Swedish under the title Det är dej jag vill ha. The song reached position number four in the Svensktoppen. 

In 1984, Kids Incorporated covered "You're the One That I Want" in the Season 1 episode "Civic Day Parade". Kids Incorporated covered "You're the One That I Want" again in 1985 in the Season 2 episode "Decade of Hits".

In 1993, Epic Records released the London cast recording, Grease – Original London Cast Recording, and "You're the One That I Want" was issued as the lead single by Craig McLachlan and Debbie Gibson (Epic UK 659 522, released July 1993). It peaked at number thirteen in the UK.

In 2021, American singer and rapper Doja Cat performed the song in a commercial for Pepsi to promote their "Soda Shop" line.

See also
 List of best-selling singles
 List of best-selling singles in France
 List of best-selling singles in the United Kingdom
 Grease: You're the One that I Want! – a reality game show where contestants competed to star on a Broadway-style revival of the musical
 List of Hot 100 number-one singles of 1978 (U.S.)

References

1978 singles
1993 singles
Billboard Hot 100 number-one singles
Debbie Gibson songs
European Hot 100 Singles number-one singles
John Travolta songs
Number-one singles in Australia
Number-one singles in Austria
Number-one singles in Finland
Number-one singles in Germany
Number-one singles in Israel
Number-one singles in New Zealand
Number-one singles in Norway
Number-one singles in Sweden
Number-one singles in Switzerland
Olivia Newton-John songs
Song recordings produced by John Farrar
Songs from Grease (film)
Songs from Grease (musical)
Songs written by John Farrar
UK Singles Chart number-one singles
1978 songs
Synth-pop songs
Male–female vocal duets
RSO Records singles
Epic Records singles
1978 neologisms